Theodore DuBose Bratton (November 11, 1862 – June 26, 1944) was a bishop of Mississippi in The Episcopal Church and the chaplain general of the United Confederate Veterans.

Early life
Bratton was born on November 11, 1862, near Winnsboro, South Carolina. He graduated from Sewanee: The University of the South, where he earned a Bachelor of Arts degree in 1887 and a bachelor of divinity in 1889.

Career
Bratton was the rector of the Church of the Advent in Spartanburg, South Carolina in 1892. He was founder of the Episcopal Church of the Resurrection in Greenwood, South Carolina in 1892–1897. He was a teacher at St Mary's School for Girls in Raleigh, North Carolina until 1903.

Bratton was appointed as a bishop of Mississippi in The Episcopal Church in 1903. In 1929, he was appointed as the chaplain general of the United Confederate Veterans.

Personal life and death
Bratton resided in Jackson, Mississippi, where he died on June 26, 1944, at 82.

References

External links

1862 births
1944 deaths
People from Jackson, Mississippi
People from Winnsboro, South Carolina
Sewanee: The University of the South alumni
Episcopal bishops of Mississippi
People born in the Confederate States